Afton Township is one of sixteen townships in Cherokee County, Iowa, USA.  At the 2000 census, its population was 287.

Geography
According to the USGS, it contains two cemeteries: Afton and Immanuel Lutheran.

Notable people
Pierre Watkin, later a veteran character actor in Hollywood, was born here in 1887.

References

External links
 US-Counties.com
 City-Data.com

Townships in Cherokee County, Iowa
Townships in Iowa